Honest Candidate is a 2020 South Korean comedy film directed by Jang Yu-jeong, starring Ra Mi-ran, Kim Mu-yeol, Na Moon-hee, Yoon Kyung-ho and Jang Dong-joo. It is the remake of the 2014 Brazilian film O Candidato Honesto. It was released on February 12, 2020.

A sequel was confirmed on February 10, 2021.

Plot
A third-term congresswoman who is running for the fourth time is suddenly unable to lie a few days before the elections are about to take place. The problem is that her whole political career is based on lies.

Cast

Main
 Ra Mi-ran as Joo Sang-sook
 Kim Mu-yeol as Park Hee-cheol
 Na Moon-hee as Kim Ok-hee
 Yoon Kyung-ho as Bong Man-sik
 Jang Dong-joo as Bong Eun-ho
Supporting
 Song Young-chang as Lee Woon-hak
 Son Jong-hak as Kim Sang-pyo
 Cho Soo-hyang as Shin Ji-sun
 Ahn Se-ho as Lee Jeong-min
 Kim Na-yoon as Yoon Mi-kyung
 Ko Kyu-pil as Reporter Hwang
 Kim Yong-rim as mother-in-law
Special appearances
 Jo Han-chul as Nam Yong-sung
 On Joo-wan as Kim Joon-young
 Yoon Se-ah as Cha Yoon-kyung
 Oh Man-seok as Jang Deok-joon

Production
Director Jang Yu-jeong came across the film O Candidato Honesto when she was recording a commentary for The Bros (2017). She said that "she could have made it to fuel anger by shedding light on the realities of local politics and press, but thought it would be more interesting to turn [it] into a satire. [She] was immediately hooked and made the decision [to make the film] in about 10 minutes."

Although the original character is a male politician in Roberto Santucci's O Candidato Honesto, director and screenwriter Jang Yu-jeong cast actress Ra Mi-ran for the role of the protagonist. As she "developed the character, [she] realized that no other person could handle this role other than Ra. That’s how the gender changed."

Principal photography began on June 15, 2019. Filming was completed on September 7.

The film is based on the 2014 Brazilian film of the same name, The Honest Candidate (Brazilian Portuguese: O Candidato Honesto). Produced based on a screenplay by Paulo Cursino, it was a hit by criticizing the reality of Brazil at the time while using the subject of 'lie' comically. The Korean remake of Brazil's Honest Candidate was announced in 2016 at the Globalgate Consortium in which the world's leading film production companies and distributors participated and received high attention.

Release
The distributor Next Entertainment World considered postponing the release of the film due to the COVID-19 pandemic but eventually decided not to, and the film was released on February 12, 2020 as originally planned.

Reception

Box office
Released on a Wednesday, the film topped its first weekend box office and constituted 44% of the total ticket sales.

Awards and nominations

Sequel
A sequel to the film titled as Honest Candidate 2 wrapped up on October 31, 2021. It is slated to release on September 28, 2022.

See also
 List of 2020 box office number-one films in South Korea

References

External links
 
 
 

2020 films
2020s Korean-language films
2020s political comedy films
South Korean political comedy films
Next Entertainment World films
South Korean remakes of Brazilian films
2020 comedy films